2018 in Malaysia is Malaysia's 61st anniversary of its independence and 55th anniversary of Malaysia's formation.

Incumbents

Federal Level

State level

Events

January

February

March

April

May
14th Malaysian general election (GE14) :
 9 May—The 14th general election was held on this day. For the first time in the country's history, the Barisan Nasional coalition was defeated by the opposition coalition Pakatan Harapan, only winning 79 seats against Pakatan Harapan's 121. The Pan-Malaysian Islamic Party won 18 seats while independents won 3 seats. Former prime minister Mahathir Mohamad, who led Pakatan Harapan to victory, manage to defeat his protege Najib Razak,
 10 May -- Mahathir Mohamad is sworn in as the seventh Prime Minister of Malaysia at 2130 hours (GMT+8), as he becomes the world's oldest elected state leader at the age of 92. This marks his return to the position after holding the post previously for 22 years, from 1981 to 2003.
 12 May -- 
 A Council of Eminent Persons is formed as government's advisory board, board members are 
 Tun Daim Zainuddin, former Finance Minister of Malaysia
 Tan Sri Zeti Akhtar Aziz, former Governor of Bank Negara Malaysia (BNM)
 Tan Sri Hassan Marican, former president and CEO of Petronas
 Robert Kuok, Hong-Kong based Malaysian billionaire tycoon
 Professor Jomo Kwame Sundaram, prominent economist
 Lim Guan Eng, Muhyiddin Yassin, and Mohamad Sabu are named for three top cabinet posts
 Former prime minister Najib Razak and wife Rosmah Mansor are barred from leaving the country
 Najib resigns as UMNO and BN chief
 13 May --
 Mahathir instructs Inland Revenue Board to return taxes collected 'illegally'.
 14 May --
 Attorney-general Mohamed Apandi Ali goes on unrecorded leave, duties taken over by solicitor-general
 MACC chief Dzulkifli Ahmad resigns
 Treasurer general Irwan Serigar Abdullah's contract shortened, transferred to Public Service Department
 Mahathir says laws on fake news will be clearly defined
 Mahathir says political appointments in government-linked companies will be reviewed.
 15 May --
 Audit Department declassifies its 1MDB report
 Council of Eminent Persons sets up a committee on institutional reforms, committee includes: 
 Retired judge of Court of Appeal Datuk KC Vohrah;
 Retired judge of the Court of Appeal and Human Rights Commission of Malaysia (Suhakam) Commissioner Datuk Mah Weng Kwai;
 National Patriot Association President Brigadier General (Rtd) Datuk Mohamed Arshad Raji;
 University Malaya Tunku Abdul Rahman Professor of Law Emeritus Professor Datuk Dr Shad Saleem Faruqi; 
 Hakam President and Bar Council former President Datuk Ambiga Sreenevasan
 Apandi Ali, Irwan Serigar, Dzulkifli and former IGP Khalid Abu Bakar barred from leaving the country.
 16 May -- 
 Pakatan Harapan de facto leader and former Deputy Prime Minister Anwar Ibrahim is released from prison after being pardoned by the Yang di-Pertuan Agong. He had served three years of his prison sentence.
 1MDB president Arul Kanda Kandasamy is also barred from leaving the country
 Police search Najib's house and seize handbags and clothes
 Government announces GST will be zero-rated effective, 1 June 2018
 Mahathir to sack 17,000 political appointees from civil service
 Registrar of Societies approves Pakatan Harapan's registration.
 Ministries instructed to cease use of 1Malaysia slogan
 Kedai Rakyat 1Malaysia 2.0 (KR1M) programme ceased
 Board meetings of the Cooperatives Commission of Malaysia and committees which have political appointees to be postponed.
 17 May
 Police search at Najib's house continues
 Finance Ministry initiates fiscal reforms.
 20 May 
 Former executive of PetroSaudi whistleblower Swiss national Xavier Justo meets Mahathir 
 21 May
 Special task force formed to investigate the 1MDB scandal as well as to prosecute wrongdoers and retrieve related assets. Task force would be jointly headed by former attorney-general Abdul Gani Patail, former MACC head Abu Kassim Mohamed, current MACC head Mohd Shukri Abdull and former special branch head Abdul Hamid Bador.
 Deputy prime minister Wan Azizah Wan Ismail and several federal ministers officially sworn in as members of cabinet.
22 May
 Former prime minister Najib Razak is brought in for questioning at the Malaysian Anti-Corruption Commission(MACC).

June

July

August

September

 1 September - Sales and services tax (SST) replaced Goods and Services Tax (GST).
 8 – 15 September - The Inaugural Asia Pacific Masters Games was held in Penang.
 11–22 September - Sukma Games was held in Perak.
 13 September - Muhammad Shafee Abdullah, the lawyer of former prime minister Najib Razak has been charged with money laundering by anti-corruption agents looking into how billions of dollars went missing from state fund 1Malaysia Development Berhad (1MDB).
 20 September - Former prime minister Najib Razak has appeared in court facing 25 charges related to the 1MDB scandal, including abuse of power and money laundering.
 26 September - Local independent publishing house ZI Publications has acquired the rights to publish a Bahasa Malaysia translation of Tom Wright and Bradley Hope's Billion Dollar Whale: The Man Who Fooled Wall Street, Hollywood, and the World.

October

November
 6 November - Prime minister Mahathir Mohamad visited Japan, and received a medal of the Emperor of Japan.
 15 November - Mahathir came back to Kuala Lumpur since end the 33rd Asean summit in Singapore.

December
 4 December - A gas piping explosion in one of the food outlet at Cityone Megamall in Kuching, Sarawak resulted in 3 deaths and 22 injuries.
8 December - The Anti-ICERD Rally was organised by opposition right-wing political parties Malaysian Islamic Party (PAS) and United Malays National Organisation (UMNO), with the support of various non-governmental organisations in response to the new Malaysian government's plan to ratify the United Nations convention known as International Convention on the Elimination of All Forms of Racial Discrimination (ICERD).
 16 December - Mohd Hafiz Nor Azman, a 22-year-old motorcycle racer was killed in an accident when competing at the Petronas AAM Malaysian Cub Prix championships at Dataran Bandar Penawar, Johor.
 17 December - Malaysia files criminal charges against Goldman Sachs and two former executives over bond sales it organized for 1MDB.
 18 December - High Court rejected former prime minister Najib Razak’s request to get the letter of authorisation (fiat) on the appointment of lead prosecutor Sulaiman Abdullah, and his application for discovery of documents pertaining to the case.

National Day and Malaysia Day

National Day theme
Sayangi Malaysiaku (Love My Malaysia)

National Day parade
Putrajaya

Malaysia Day celebration
Kota Kinabalu, Sabah

Sports
 16 – 21 January – 2018 Malaysian Badminton Masters
 3 – 10 March – 2018 Sultan Azlan Shah Cup
 18 – 25 March – 2018 Tour de Langkawi
 26 June – 1 July – 2018 Malaysian Badminton Open
 8 – 15 September – 2018 Asia Pacific Masters Games
 11 – 22  September – 2018 Sukma Games
 20 September – 7 October – 2018 AFC U-16 Championship
 6 – 13 October – 2018 Sultan of Johor Cup
 15 – 20 October – 2018 Sopma Games
 4 November – 2018 Shell Malaysia Motorcycle Grand Prix
 23 – 28 November – 2018 Para Sukma Games
 25 November – 2018 Penang Bridge International Marathon

Deaths 
 25 January –  - Actor
 16 April – Napsiah Omar – Malaysian politician
6 May - Lai Meng
 8 September - Abu Hassan Omar - Malaysian Politician
 14 October - - Singer

See also
 2018
 2017 in Malaysia | 2019 in Malaysia
 History of Malaysia
 2018 in Malaysian football
 1Malaysia Development Berhad scandal

References

 
Malaysia
2010s in Malaysia
Years of the 21st century in Malaysia
Malaysia